Cecil C. Castellucci (born October 25, 1969 in New York City), also known as Cecil Seaskull, is an American-born Canadian young adult novelist, indie rocker, and director. She currently lives in Los Angeles, California.

Biography
Castellucci grew up in New York City where she attended the Laguardia High School of the Performing Arts. She later studied theatre in Paris at the École Florent. She attended Concordia University in Montreal and received a B.F.A. in Film Production.

In Montreal, she embarked on her music career as part of Bite, which was then the only all-female indie band in Montreal.  When she was kicked out of Bite, she formed Nerdy Girl with Gordon Hashimoto. When Hashimoto left, she joined with Ron Woo, Gabe Levine, and Kim Temple to continue the band. After recording their only album Twist Her, Levine and Temple left the group, and Jessica Moss and Eric Craven took their places. She later moved to Los Angeles after Nerdy Girl broke up for good, and she recorded solo under her performing name, Cecil Seaskull.

In 2001 she co-founded the experimental *Alpha 60 Film Collective with Neil Matsumoto and Nicholas McCarthy.

Castellucci's first novel, Boy Proof, was published in 2005.

Castellucci's 2013 short story—"We Have Always Lived on Mars" is being adapted into John Krasinski’s upcoming film, Life on Mars.

Castellucci is a Star Trek fan, with her favorite series being Star Trek: Deep Space Nine. Her favourite character is Dax.

Novels
Castellucci's first novels were published by Candlewick Press. She has also been published by Scholastic Press, DC Comics and Roaring Brook Press

Boy Proof is a 2005 novel about a girl in Los Angeles named Victoria Jurgen, who insists on being called "Egg" after a character in her favorite movie, a (fictional) post-apocalyptic, science fiction film called Terminal Earth. Her mother is a washed-up actress and her father is special-effects designer. She is a card-carrying geek and considers herself "boy proof", and proud of it. However, her outlook on life is challenged when a boy named Max Carter comes to her school and she finds herself reluctantly drawn to him.

It was named to the 2006 Best Books for Young Adults list by the Young Adult Library Services Association (YALSA) of the American Library Association (ALA) as well as to the Quick Picks for Reluctant Young Adult Readers list (also by YALSA).

Castellucci's 2006 novel The Queen of Cool centers on Libby Brin, one of the most popular girls in her school, whose life revolves around parties and boys. Deciding one day that she is bored with her glamorous lifestyle, she signs up for an internship at the local zoo, where she meets up with Tina, a dwarf with a huge personality, and a boy named Sheldon, which give her cause to question her priorities. As she spends more time with unpopular people, she realizes that they are actually good friends and that she has more fun with them than with her regular friends.

The 2007 novel Beige, focuses on Katy, a French-Canadian girl who is forced to spend a summer with her estranged father, Beau "The Rat" Ratner, member of Los Angeles's most infamous punk band-that-never-made-it, Suck. Suck is about to come off its hiatus, and the Rat hopes he can use the band as an opportunity to bond with his daughter, a decision made difficult by her dislike of music.

The 2010 novel Rose Sees Red is set in New York in the 1980s, and centers on two ballet dancers (one American, one Russian), recounting the unforgettable night they spend in the city, and celebrating the friendship they form despite their cultural and political differences.

In the 2011 picture book Grandma's Gloves, a young girl and her grandmother bond over gardening. A story about a child who loses a beloved grandparent and finds comfort in carrying on the activities they shared. It won the California Book Award Gold Medal for Juvenile category.

In the 2011 novel First Day on Earth, a man named Mal thinks he has been abducted by aliens and starts going to an alien abduction support group where he meets Hooper, who may or may not be a traveler from another world.

The Year of the Beasts (2012), a hybrid prose / graphic novel illustrated by Nate Powell, is the story of two sisters and the summer they have together juxtaposed with a comics story of a girl who wakes up as a Medusa.

Odd Duck (2013) illustrated by Sara Varon is about two ducks who form a friendship despite both being odd.

The young adult novel Tin Star, about a girl abandoned on an alien space station, was published in February 2014. Stone in the Sky, sequel to Tin Star, was published by Roaring Brook Press in 2015.

Moving Target: A Princess Leia Adventure, part of the Star Wars: Journey to Star Wars - The Force Awakens series, was published September 2015.

The graphic novel Soupy Leaves Home, about a train-hopping runaway in 1932, was published by Dark Horse Comics in April 2017.

Comics

The P.L.A.I.N. Janes (2007)
Castellucci wrote the inaugural graphic novel for DC Comics's Minx imprint, which targets the YA audience. A long time comic book fan (she invited Batman to her fourth birthday party), Cecil jumped at the opportunity when contacted by Group Editor Shelly Bond.

The story follows a girl named Jane who moves to suburbia after a terrorist attack in her hometown of Metro City.  In the chaos after the attack, she finds a "John Doe" and his sketchbook. He serves as an inspiration for her to spread art to others.  Jane's family decides to move away from Metro City in favor of a more sheltered, quiet community, where Jane spends a lot of time drawing in the sketchbook. This book becomes her inspiration to form P.L.A.I.N. (People Loving Art In Neighborhoods).  At school, she rejects the popular girls, and instead finds her "tribe" with three other girls named Jayne (aka Brain Jane), Jane (Theater Jane), and Polly Jane (Sporty Jane). Even though each girl embodies a high school stereotype, as the story progresses, readers see how each girl grows out of her mold and presents her other interests and abilities.  They band together to form P.L.A.I.N. and commit "art attacks" to fight against their individual hardships and emotions but end up fighting against the social hierarchy.  They eventually inspire other teens to use art as their weapons as well.  At the end of the story, when Main Jane tries to admit that she was behind the P.L.A.I.N. attacks, the police dismiss her confession because they believe the attacks were too labor-intensive to be done by a girl. This part of the story challenges the notion that anything involving physical labor is exclusively for men.

Jane refuses to be defined as a victim of her terrorist attack experience, unlike her parents who are shackled by their fear; instead, she transforms her trauma into art through P.L.A.I.N.  The Plain Janes' message of "art saves" embodies the idea of giving people permission, even inspiration to face their fears and to move forward, while in addition aims to challenge conformity and to bring back life and spirit into the town of Kent Waters.  The story shows how Jane (Main Jane) is comfortable with her own identity as an individual and refuses to conform to what society defines as "cool." An example of this would be the first P.L.A.I.N "attack" which protest the building of the new shopping mall, challenging what the students defined as "cool."  By participating in these "attacks," the Janes are able to empower both themselves and their community by pushing the boundaries of normalcy and bringing a sense of imagination and spontaneity to the otherwise monotonous suburbia.

A Canadian citizen, Castellucci won the Joe Shuster Award in the category of "Outstanding Canadian Comic Book Writer" for Janes.

A sequel, called Janes in Love, was released in 2008. The sequel follows P.L.A.I.N as they play Cupid, become entangled in affairs of the heart (both their own and others), and procure a spot in Metro City Museum of Modern Art Contest.

Shade, the Changing Girl
In October 2016, DC debuted a new imprint: Young Animal. One of the initial titles was Shade, The Changing Girl, written by Castellucci, in which Shade is a female high school student. The creative team behind this new version also includes artist Marley Zarcone. After 12 issues and the Milk Wars tie-in Shade The Changing Girl/Wonder Woman Special (written with Mirka Andolfo), the series was relaunched as the six-issue Shade, the Changing Woman.

Music

Nerdy Girl

Nerdy Girl 10" EP (1994)
Released by No Life Records

 Do You Like Me?
 Glad To Know
 Roof of Wilson
 Hate Me
 Nerdy Girl
 Song 7

New Jersey 7" single (1995)
Released by RightWide Records

3 songs, including a cover of The Beatles' She Said She Said, and "After Having Cried".

Dime Store Hussy 7" single (1996)
Released by No Life Records.

 Scream
 18 Foot Yacht
 Perhaps

Twist Her (1997)
Released by No Life Records. Available on iTunes store.

 Casa Nova
 Hate Me
 Georgiana
 Iceman (Murder on the Rue Morgue)
 Anne Elliot
 Cast Off
 Single Bed
 Weed
 Do You Like Me
 Wicked
 3 Wishes
 Judy
 Aranova

Cecil Seaskull

Whoever (1998)
Released by Teenage USA Recordings. Available on iTunes store.

 True Love
 2E
 La Song (feat. Rufus Wainwright)
 Toutes ces filles
 Beautiful Everything
 Fairfax & Melrose
 Cheap
 The Bruise
 Dim
 Ridiculous
 What's Wrong?
 Sweet Girl

For Lovers and Rats (unreleased)
Contains tracks "Ode to a Boy with a Girlfriend," "Liquor and Cigarettes," and "Whisper This to Me", (the latter two are available streaming from her MySpace page)

Other songs
"My Chores" for Canadian Music Week 1997, on the compilation album Northern Exposure. It is also available streaming on her MySpace page
"Take Me" on indie compilation album Try for Summer, Plan for Fall, released in 1999.
Also available on her MySpace page is a live cover version of The Muppets' "Movin' Right Along"

Les Aventures de Madame Merveille
In 2010 Castellucci was commissioned by ECM+ in Montreal along with composer André Ristic to write a libretto for an opera called Les Aventures de Madame Merveille. The live comic book opera featured art by Michael Cho, Pascal Girard, Scott K Hepburn and Cameron Stewart. It premiered May 6, 2010 and was remounted in Fall 2011.

Films
Starwoids is a 2001 documentary about the Star Wars fans who camped out in front of Grauman's Chinese Theatre for six weeks in order to buy tickets for Star Wars: Episode I – The Phantom Menace. Cecil was one of these fans. She also appears in the special features on the Special Edition DVD, released in 2005.

Through Alpha 60, Castellucci made this ensemble film based on the actors' responses to a questionnaire. It premiered at the Alternative Screen series at the Egyptian Theatre in Los Angeles.

Bibliography

Novels 

 Boyproof. 2005, Penguin Random House
 Star Wars: Moving Target
Don't Cosplay with My Heart, 2018, Scholastic Press

Short fiction 

"Always the Same. Till it is Not". Apex Magazine
"Brother. Prince. Snake". Tor.com
 "The Marker". After, edited by Ellen Datlow and Terri Windling.
 "Best Friends Forever". Teeth, edited by Ellen Datlow and Terri Windling.
"Wet Teeth". The Eternal Kiss: 13 Vampire Tales of Blood and Desire, edited by Trisha Telep.
"The Sound of Useless Wings". Tor.com
"Once You're a Jedi, You're a Jedi All the Way". Geektastic. With Holly Black.

Other works 

 Geektastic. Co-edited with author Holly Black.
 "My Fairy Godfathers". Girls Who Like Boys Who Like Boys.
"Bad Reputation". First Kiss (Then Tell): A Collection of True Lip-Locked Moments, edited by Cylin Busby.

Awards 
 2018 Eisner Award nomination for Best Short Story: "Ethel Byrne"
 2018 Harvey Award nomination for Book of the Year: Shade the Changing Girl
 2018 EGL (Excellence in Graphic Literature) Award nominations in three categories — Book of the Year, Best Middle Grade, Mosaic Award: Soupy Leaves Home
 2018 Best Feminist Reads Amelia Bloomer Award: Soupy Leaves Home

References

External links
 
LiveJournal
MySpace page
I Heart YA
Alpha 60 Film Collective
Interview With Cecil Castellucci at pinkraygun.com
Interview at BookReviewsAndMore.ca
Visual Bibliography at BookReviewsAndMore.ca
 
 

1969 births
Living people
American women film directors
American indie rock musicians
Female comics writers
American writers of young adult literature
Musicians from New York City
Canadian indie rock musicians
Joe Shuster Award winners for Outstanding Writer
Concordia University alumni
Canadian writers of young adult literature
Canadian women film directors
Women writers of young adult literature
Film directors from New York City
American female comics artists
Canadian female comics artists
21st-century American women
Inkpot Award winners